Aetat (short for ) was a Norwegian government agency responsible for battling unemployment.

History
It had its roots in the Directorate of Labour, which was founded in 1945. Its purpose was to "prevent and remedy" unemployment in the Norwegian society. The name Aetat was taken into use in 2000, when the directorate was reorganized. Aetat had eighteen county offices, several local offices, and other branches, whereas the directorate remained the core of the agency. The leader of the directorate was called the "director of labour". The agency was subordinate to the Ministry of Government Administration.

Successor
In 2005 the Parliament of Norway agreed to abolish Aetat as well as the National Insurance Service, with effect from 2006. A new organization was created in their place, the Norwegian Labour and Welfare Administration (NAV) which consists of the state-run Norwegian Labour and Welfare Service and certain parts of the municipal social services, and has a broader responsibility for welfare. The reform that created NAV is not completed yet.

References

Defunct government agencies of Norway
Government agencies established in 1945
Government agencies disestablished in 2006
Organisations based in Oslo